The 2021 European Korfball B-Championship was held in Wrocław, Poland from 4 to 9 October 2021. The tournament was originally supposed to be played from 5 to 10 October 2020, but was postponed following COVID-19 measures.

Qualified teams

Group stage
The eight teams were divided into two groups of four. The first two of each group advanced to the main bracket. The last two of each group continued in the consolidation bracket to determine a full ranking of 9th to 16th place. (As places 1 through 8 are awarded to teams playing in the 2021 IKF European Korfball A-Championship.

Group A

|}

Group B

|}

Knockout stage

Main bracket

Consolidation bracket

Final standing

External links
Official website 

European Korfball Championship
2021 in korfball
2021 in Polish sport
International sports competitions hosted by Poland
Korfball in Poland
IKF European Korfball B-Championship